The Branch River is a  river in eastern Wisconsin in the United States.  It is a tributary of the Manitowoc River, which flows to Lake Michigan.

According to the Geographic Names Information System, the river has also been known as the "Center River" and as the "Centre River".  The United States Board on Geographic Names settled on "Branch River" as the stream's official name in 1912.

See also
List of Wisconsin rivers

Sources

DeLorme (1992).  Wisconsin Atlas & Gazetteer.  Freeport, Maine: DeLorme.  .

Rivers of Wisconsin
Rivers of Brown County, Wisconsin
Rivers of Manitowoc County, Wisconsin
Tributaries of Lake Michigan